C/2014 Q3 (Borisov) is a periodic comet discovered at apparent magnitude 17 on 22 August 2014 by amateur astronomer Gennadiy Borisov using a  astrograph. It is the third comet discovered by Borisov. The comet is best viewed from the northern hemisphere.

The comet was expected to reach about magnitude ~11 near perihelion (closest approach to the Sun), but brightened to around magnitude 10. By 8 November 2014, the comet had a declination of +83 and was circumpolar from the northern hemisphere. The comet came to perihelion on 19 November 2014 at a distance of 1.65 au from the Sun.

Before entering the planetary region (epoch 1950), C/2014 Q3 had an orbital period of 148 years. After leaving the planetary region (epoch 2050), it has an orbital period of 146 years.

See also
 List of Halley-type comets
2I/Borisov

References 

20140822
Halley-type comets
Comets in 2014
Discoveries by amateur astronomers